UPMC Outpatient Center is a  outpatient facility that provides, among other services, Orthopaedic services, primary care services, and physicians offices to the residents of Pittsburgh's  South Side neighborhood.  UPMC Outpatient Center operates according to the directives established by the United States Conference of Catholic Bishops and will not provide or permit medical procedures that are contrary to the teachings of the Roman Catholic Church.

History
Founded in 1892 as South Side Hospital, the facility quickly grew from a 30 beds located inside a warehouse on Mary Street to 70 beds. The hospital next added an annex in 1909 and a nine-story East Wing in 1950. These older facilities were demolished  in 1982 to make way for the current facility which at the time cost $39 million. On May 1, 1996, the hospital merged with the University of Pittsburgh Medical Center (UPMC) to become UPMC South Side and continued to serve as a 149-bed community hospital in the UPMC system. In June 2008, UPMC announced it would  close and consolidate UPMC South Side with UPMC Mercy, which is less than two miles (3 km) away, and was undergoing $75-$90 million in expansions to its campus.  South Side ended its hospital designation on June 30, 2009, when the emergency department closed its doors, transferring patients to UPMC Mercy. UPMC South Side reopened as the UPMC Mercy South Side Outpatient Center on July 1, 2009.

References

External links

 

Hospital buildings completed in 1909
UPMC South Side
UPMC South Side
University of Pittsburgh Medical Center